Confetti is small pieces of paper or plastic, thrown at celebrations, especially weddings.
Confetti may also refer to:
Confetti candy, confectionery foods
Confetti (1927 film), a 1927 British drama film
Confetti (2006 film), a 2006 British mockumentary film

Music
Confetti (band), a British band in the early 1990s
Confetti's, a Belgian new beat band in the late 1980s
Confetti (Sérgio Mendes album), 1984
Confetti (Little Birdy album), 2009
Confetti (Little Mix album), 2020
"Confetti" (Little Mix song), the title track
The Confetti Tour, album-supporting concert tour by Little Mix in 2022
"Confetti", song by Hilary Duff from Breathe In. Breathe Out.
"Confetti", song by Sia from This Is Acting
"Confetti", a 2012 song by Tori Kelly from Handmade Songs